Yuxarı Məzrə is a village in the Jabrayil District of Azerbaijan.

History 
During the Soviet period the village was a part of the Hadrut District of the Nagorno-Karabakh Autonomous Oblast. According to the 1989 population census the village had an Armenian population.

The village was a part of the Hadrut Province of the breakaway Republic of Artsakh during the period between 1991 and 2020, referred to as Dzoragyugh. The village was captured by Azerbaijan during the 2020 Nagorno-Karabakh war on November 7, 2020.

References

External links 
 

Populated places in Jabrayil District
Populated places in Hadrut Province